Roby Lakatos (born 1965) is a violinist from Hungary who combines jazz, classical, and Hungarian Romani music.

Career
Lakatos was born in 1965 into a family of Romani violinists descended from János Bihari, a composer who influenced Brahms and Liszt. He was introduced to music as a child. When he was nine years old, he made his public debut as first violinist in a Romani band. In 1984 he won first prize for classical violin at the Béla Bartók Conservatory of Budapest.

For the next ten years, he led the house band at a Brussels restaurant where he was complimented by Yehudi Menuhin for his performance of a piece by Liszt. In March 2004, he appeared with the London Symphony Orchestra in the orchestra's Genius of the Violin festival with Maxim Vengerov.

Lakatos recorded a Prokofiev album with Polina Leschenko, Christian Poltéra, and Martha Argerich; Klezmer Karma with the Franz Liszt Chamber Orchestra, Yiddish singer Myriam Fuks, and accordionist Aldo Granato; Roby Lakatos with Musical Friends with Stéphane Grappelli, Vadim Repin, Randy Brecker, Tony Lakatos (his brother), Marc Fosset, and the Vieuxtemps Quartet.

Discography
 1991: In Gypsy Style
 1998: Alouette König der Zigeunergeiger
 1998: Lakatos
 1999: Post Phrasing Lakatos Best
 1999: Live from Budapest
 2002: Kinoshita Meets Lakatos
 2002: As Time Goes By (Deutsche Grammophon)
 2004: The Legend of the Toad
 2005: Fire Dance (Avanticlassic)
 2006: Klezmer Karma (Avanticlassic)
 2006: Rodrigo y Gabriela as guest
 2008: Roby Lakatos with Musical Friends
 2008: Boleritza as guest
 2009: Gypsy Violin Virtuoso
 2012: La Passion: Live at Sydney Opera House (Avanticlassic)
 2015: Antonio Vivaldi: The Four Seasons (Avanticlassic)

References

External links 
 Official site
 Museum of European Art article

1965 births
Living people
20th-century Hungarian musicians
21st-century Hungarian musicians
Romani violinists
Romani fiddlers
Hungarian violinists
Male violinists
Hungarian fiddlers
Jazz violinists
Hungarian Romani people
Musicians from Budapest
21st-century violinists
20th-century Hungarian male musicians
21st-century Hungarian male musicians
Male jazz musicians